The year 1830 in architecture involved some significant events.

Buildings and structures

Buildings

 The Altes Museum in Berlin, designed by Karl Friedrich Schinkel, which was begun in 1823, is completed.
 The Glyptothek museum in Munich, designed by Leo von Klenze, is completed.
 The Museo Correr, a museum in Venice, Italy, is established.
 The Yorkshire Museum in York, England is completed.
 The Wellington Arch in London, designed by Decimus Burton, is completed in its original position.
 St Mary's Church, Bramall Lane, Sheffield, England, designed by Joseph Potter, is consecrated.
 Old Mosque, Ufa, Russia.
 Liverpool and Manchester Railway opened in England. The two original terminuses are Crown Street station in Liverpool and Liverpool Road station in Manchester.

Births
 April 14 — William R. Walker, American architect based in Providence, Rhode Island (died 1905)
 June 7 – Edward Middleton Barry, English architect (died 1880)
 July 19 – Alfred Waterhouse, English architect (died 1905)
 November 7 – Emanuele Luigi Galizia, Maltese architect and civil engineer (died 1907)
 Approximate date – John Giles, English architect (died 1900)

Deaths
 September 15 – François Baillairgé, Canadian artist, woodcarver and architect (born 1759)

References

Architecture
Years in architecture
19th-century architecture